The following are the regional bird lists by continent.

For another list see :Category:Lists of birds by location

Africa

Northern Africa

 Algeria
 Egypt
 Libya
 Morocco
 Sudan
 Tunisia
 Western Sahara
 Canary Islands (ES)
 Ceuta (ES)
 Melilla (ES)
 Madeira (PT)

Horn of Africa

 Djibouti
 Eritrea
 Ethiopia
 Somalia

Eastern Africa

 Burundi
 Comoros
 Kenya
 Madagascar
 Malawi
 Mauritius
 Rodrigues
 Mayotte (FR)
 Mozambique
 Réunion (FR)
 Rwanda
 Seychelles
 South Sudan
 Uganda
 Tanzania
 Zanzibar
 Zambia
 Zimbabwe

Middle Africa

 Angola
 Cameroon
 Central African Republic
 Chad
 Republic of the Congo
 Democratic Republic of the Congo
 Equatorial Guinea
 Annobon
 Gabon
 São Tomé and Príncipe

Southern Africa

 Botswana
 Lesotho
 Namibia
 South Africa
 Gauteng
 Eswatini

Western Africa

 Benin
 Burkina Faso
 Cape Verde
 Côte d'Ivoire
 The Gambia
 Ghana
 Guinea
 Guinea-Bissau
 Liberia
 Mali
 Mauritania
 Niger
 Nigeria
 Rivers State
 Saint Helena (UK)
 Ascension Island
 Tristan da Cunha
 Inaccessible Island
 Nightingale Islands
 Gough Island
 Senegal
 Sierra Leone
 Togo

North America

Caribbean

 Anguilla (UK)
 Antigua and Barbuda
 Bahamas
 Barbados
 Cayman Islands (UK)
 Cuba
 Dominica
 Grenada
 Guadeloupe (FR)
 Hispaniola
 Dominican Republic
 Haiti
 Jamaica
 Martinique (FR)
 Montserrat (UK)
 Navassa Island (US) (United States Minor Outlying Islands-Caribbean)
 Providencia (Colombia)
 Puerto Rico (US)
 Vieques (US)
 Saba (NL)
 Saint Barthélemy (FR)
 Sint Eustatius (NL)
 Saint Kitts and Nevis
 Saint Lucia
 Saint Martin (FR, NL)
 Saint Martin (FR)
 Sint Maarten (NL)
 Saint Vincent and the Grenadines
 Turks and Caicos Islands (UK)
 British Virgin Islands (UK)
 United States Virgin Islands (US)

Central America

 Belize
 Costa Rica
 Cocos Island
 El Salvador
 Guatemala
 Honduras
 Nicaragua
 Panama

North America

 Bermuda (UK)
 Canada
 Alberta
 British Columbia
 Manitoba
 New Brunswick
 Newfoundland and Labrador
 Northwest Territories
 Nova Scotia
 Nunavut
 Ontario
 Prince Edward Island
 Quebec
 Saskatchewan
 Yukon
 Greenland (DK)
 Mexico
 Saint Pierre and Miquelon (FR)
 United States of America
 Alabama
 Alaska
 Aleutian Islands
 Arizona
 Arkansas
 California
 Santa Barbara Islands
 Colorado
 Connecticut
 Delaware
 District of Columbia
 Florida
 Georgia
 Idaho
 Illinois
 Indiana
 Iowa
 Kansas
 Kentucky
 Louisiana
 Maine
 Maryland
 Massachusetts
 Michigan
 Minnesota
 Mississippi
 Missouri
 Montana
 Nebraska
 Nevada
 New Hampshire
 New Jersey
 New Mexico
 New York
 North Carolina
 North Dakota
 Ohio
 Oklahoma
 Oregon
 Pennsylvania
 Rhode Island
 South Carolina
 South Dakota
 Tennessee
 Texas
 Utah
 Vermont
 Virginia
 Washington
 West Virginia
 Wisconsin
 Wyoming

South America

 Argentina
 Bolivia
 Brazil
 Fernando de Noronha
 Chile
 Juan Fernández Islands
 Colombia
 Ecuador
 Galápagos Islands
 Falkland Islands (UK)
 French Guiana (FR)
 Guyana
 Paraguay
 Peru
 Suriname
 Uruguay
 Venezuela

Caribbean

 Aruba (NL)
 Bonaire (NL)
 Curaçao
 Trinidad and Tobago

Asia

Central Asia

 Kazakhstan
 Kyrgyzstan
 Tajikistan
 Turkmenistan
 Uzbekistan

Eastern Asia

 China
 Hainan
 Tibet
 Hong Kong
 Macau
 Japan
 Bonin Islands
 Ryukyu Islands
 Korea
 Korea, DPR
 Korea, Republic of
 Mongolia
 Taiwan

Southeastern Asia

 Brunei
 Cambodia
 East Timor
 Indonesia
 Iran
 Irian Jaya
 Java
 Kalimantan
 Lesser Sunda Islands
 Maluku Islands
 Sulawesi
 Sumatra
 Tanimbar Islands
 West Timor
 Laos
 Malaysia
 Malay Peninsula
 Malaysian Borneo
 Myanmar
 Philippines
 Luzon
 Mindanao
 Mindoro
 Negros
 Palawan
 Panay
 Samar
 Singapore
 South China Sea Islands
 Paracel Islands (CN, VN)
 Pratas Island (TW)
 Spratly Islands (CN, MY, PH, TW, VN)
 Thailand
 Vietnam

Southern Asia

 Afghanistan
 Bangladesh
 Bhutan
 Chagos Archipelago (UK)
 Cocos (Keeling) Islands (AU)
 India
 Andhra Pradesh
 Goa
 Karnataka
 Kerala
 Tamil Nadu
 Telangana
 Andaman and Nicobar Islands
 Maldives
 Nepal
 Pakistan
 Sri Lanka

The Middle East

 Armenia
 Azerbaijan
 Bahrain
 Cyprus
 Georgia
 Iraq
 Israel
 Jordan
 Kuwait
 Lebanon
 Oman
 Palestine
 Qatar
 Saudi Arabia
 Syria
 Turkey
 United Arab Emirates
 Yemen
 Socotra

Europe

Eastern Europe

 Belarus
 Czech Republic
 Hungary
 Poland
 Russia
 Franz Josef Land
 Kuril Islands
 Novaya Zemlya
 Wrangel Island
 Slovakia
 Ukraine

Northern Europe

 Denmark
 Estonia
 Faroe Islands (DK)
 Finland
 Åland Islands
 Iceland
 Ireland
 Latvia
 Lithuania
 Norway
 Jan Mayen
 Svalbard
 Sweden
 United Kingdom
Great Britain
 England
 Scotland
 Wales
 Channel Islands
 Guernsey
 Jersey
 Isle of Man
 Northern Ireland

Southern Europe

 Albania
 Andorra
 Bosnia and Herzegovina
 Bulgaria
 Corsica (FR)
 Croatia
 Gibraltar (UK)
 Greece
 Crete
 Italy
 Sardinia
 Sicily
 Malta
 Moldova
 Monaco
 Montenegro
 North Macedonia
 Portugal
 Azores
 Romania
 San Marino
 Serbia
 Slovenia
 Spain
 Balearic Islands
 Vatican City

Western Europe

 Austria
 Belgium
 France
 Germany
 Liechtenstein
 Luxembourg
 Monaco
 Netherlands
 Switzerland

Oceania

Australia and New Zealand

 Australia
 Coral Sea Islands
 Queensland
 New South Wales
 Northern Territory
 South Australia
 Tasmania
 Victoria
 Western Australia
 Ashmore Reef (AU)
 Christmas Island (AU)
 Lord Howe Island (AU)
 Norfolk Island (AU)
 New Zealand
 North Island
 South Island
 Stewart Island
 Auckland Islands (NZ) 
 Chatham Islands (NZ)
 Kermadec Islands (NZ)
 Antipodes Islands (NZ)
 Bounty Islands (NZ)
 Campbell Islands (NZ)

Melanesia

 Fiji
 New Guinea
 West New Guinea (Indonesian province)
 Papua New Guinea
 Louisiade Archipelago
 Bismarck Archipelago
 Admiralty Islands
 New Britain
 New Ireland
 Bougainville (Papua New Guinea)
 New Caledonia (FR)
 Torres Strait Islands (AU/Papua New Guinea)
 Solomon Islands
 Vanuatu

Micronesia

 Guam (US)
 Kiribati
 Marshall Islands
 Federated States of Micronesia
 Kosrae
 Pohnpei
 Hall Islands
 Yap Islands
 Chuuk Islands
 Nauru
 Northern Mariana Islands (US)
 Palau
 United States Minor Outlying Islands-Pacific
 Baker Island (US)
 Howland Island (US)
 Jarvis Island (US)
 Johnston Atoll (US)
 Kingman Reef (US)
 Midway Islands (US)
 Palmyra Atoll (US)
 Wake Island (US)

Polynesia

 American Samoa (US)
 Cook Islands (NZ)
 Easter Island (CL)
 French Polynesia (FR)
Society Islands
Tahiti
Bora Bora
Tuamotus
Gambier Islands
Marquesas Islands
Austral Islands
 Hawaii (US)
 Kauai
 Maui
 Oahu
 Lanai
 Molokai
 Hawaii
 Niue (NZ)
 Pitcairn (UK)
 Samoa
 Tokelau (NZ)
 Tonga
 Tuvalu
 Wallis and Futuna (FR)

Antarctica & Southern Ocean islands

 Antarctica
 Bouvet Island (NO)
 British Antarctic Territory (UK)
 South Georgia and the South Sandwich Islands
 South Orkney Islands
 South Shetland Islands
 French Southern and Antarctic Lands (FR)
 Amsterdam Island
 Crozet Islands
 Kerguelen Islands
 Saint Paul Island
 Heard and McDonald Islands (AU)
 Macquarie Island (AU)
 Prince Edward Islands (S. Africa)

See also 
List of birds
List of birds by common name
Sibley–Monroe checklist

 
Birds